Mali has a long and historical tradition of participating in the Africa Cup of Nations.

Even though Mali's participation in the AFCON prior to 21st century was sporadic, they managed a number of notable achievements. In their debut at 1972 Africa Cup of Nations, Mali finished runners-up behind Congo, a great feat up to date. Prior to 2008, each time Mali qualified, they reached the knockout stage, having only qualified four times before then. Mali hosted the 2002 Africa Cup of Nations; it is the only time Mali have hosted the tournament thus far. In 2015, Mali was eliminated with controversy because of drawing of lots to Guinea.

Overall record

Tournaments and squads

References

External links
Africa Cup of Nations - Archives competitions - cafonline.com

Mali national football team
Countries at the Africa Cup of Nations